Alessya Safronova (born 10 February 1986) is a Kazakhstani female volleyball player.

She was part of the Kazakhstan women's national volleyball team. On club level she played for Iller Bankasi in 2013.

During the 2018 Asian Games she led the team to victory over Philippines, and despite an error, ended up scoring 11–25, 25–22, 15–25, 25–19, 14–16 with personal best being 13 markers.

References

External links

 

1986 births
Living people
Kazakhstani women's volleyball players
Place of birth missing (living people)
Volleyball players at the 2018 Asian Games
Asian Games competitors for Kazakhstan